The men's freestyle welterweight competition at the 1936 Summer Olympics in Berlin took place from 2 August to 4 August at the Deutschlandhalle. Nations were limited to one competitor. This weight class was limited to wrestlers weighing up to 72kg.

This freestyle wrestling competition continued to use the "bad points" elimination system introduced at the 1928 Summer Olympics for Greco-Roman and at the 1932 Summer Olympics for freestyle wrestling, with a slight modification. Each round featured all wrestlers pairing off and wrestling one bout (with one wrestler having a bye if there were an odd number). The loser received 3 points if the loss was by fall or unanimous decision and 2 points if the decision was 2-1 (this was the modification from prior years, where all losses were 3 points). The winner received 1 point if the win was by decision and 0 points if the win was by fall. At the end of each round, any wrestler with at least 5 points was eliminated.

Schedule

Results

Round 1

Of the winners, five won by fall and advanced with 0 points while three won by decision and moved to the second round with 1 point. The losers featured two by split decision (2 points), 1 by unanimous decision (3 points), and five by fall (3 points).

 Bouts

 Points

Round 2

Four men finished the second round with 2–0 records; Lewis was the only one to win both by fall and have 0 points, while the other three had one win by fall and one by decision. Eight wrestlers had a 1–1 record, with six of them ending the round with 3 points and two finishing with 4 points. The four contestants who were 0–2 were eliminated.

 Bouts

 Points

Round 3

The four men who began the round undefeated stayed that way; none facing each other, they all won. Lewis remained in the lead with 0 points, Angst and Jourlin stayed at 1 point apiece, and Paar added a second point. Two men, Andersson and Schleimer, improved to 2–1 and stayed at 3 points with wins by fall. The six men who lost in this round all finished 1–2 and were eliminated.

 Bouts

 Points

Round 4

The first bout was the only one which resulted in elimination, as Paar's 3–1 record nevertheless gave him 5 bad points. Jourlin received his second point in the bout, but this was enough to take the lead as Lewis and Angst lost. Lewis, who entered the round at 0 points had the opportunity to eliminate Andersson but was thrown instead, both of the men in that bout finishing the round with 3 points. Schleimer also survived potential elimination by beating Angst; Schleimer stayed at 3 points while Angst moved to 4.

 Bouts

 Points

Round 5

Schleimer had the advantage of a bye, staying at 3 points. Andersson picked up a fourth point in eliminating Jourlin by decision. Lewis captured the gold medal with his win by fall in this round, eliminating Angst and leaving only three men standing. Lewis, however, had already faced both other men (defeating Schleimer in round 2 and losing to Andersson in round 4), so could not face either again. No matter the result of the bout between Andersson and Schleimer in round 6, Lewis would be the victor. He was tied at 3 points with Schleimer, but even if Schleimer won by fall in round 6 (staying at 3), Lewis had the head-to-head win as tie-breaker. And with 3 points to Andersson's 4, Lewis would have a better score than Andersson after the final round even if Andersson won by fall–and Lewis would therefore take gold despite having lost to Andersson.

 Bouts

 Points

Round 6

Lewis had defeated Schleimer in round 2 and fallen to Andersson in round 4, so could not face either again and had guaranteed himself the gold medal. The only remaining bout possible was Schleimer against Andersson, with the winner to take silver and the loser bronze. Andersson defeated Schleimer.

 Bouts

 Points

References

Wrestling at the 1936 Summer Olympics